Austin Williams may refer to:

Austin Williams (abolitionist) (1805–1885); see Austin F. Williams Carriagehouse and House
Austin Williams (actor) (born 1996), American actor
Austin B. Williams (1919–1999), American carcinologist
Austin Henry Williams (1890–1973), British polo player